9th TFCA Awards
December 21, 2005

Best Film: 
 A History of Violence 
The 9th Toronto Film Critics Association Awards, honoring the best in film for 2005, were given on 21 December 2005.

Winners
Best Actor: 
Philip Seymour Hoffman – Capote
Best Actress: 
Laura Linney – The Squid and the Whale
Best Animated Film:
Wallace & Gromit: The Curse of the Were-Rabbit
Best Canadian Film: 
A History of Violence
Best Director: 
David Cronenberg – A History of Violence
Best Documentary Film:
Grizzly Man
Best Film:
A History of Violence
Best First Feature: 
Capote
Best Foreign Language Film: 
The World • China/Japan/France
Best Screenplay: 
The Squid and the Whale – Noah Baumbach
Best Supporting Actor: 
Paul Giamatti – Cinderella Man
Best Supporting Actress: 
Catherine Keener – Capote

The TFCA has honoured Andy Serkis with a special citation for his work helping to realize the main character in King Kong.

References

2005
2005 film awards
2005 in Toronto
2005 in Canadian cinema